"Stinkfist" is a song by the American metal band Tool. It is their first industry single and first music video release from their second major label album Ænima.

Interpretation
The song title, the lyrics and the perceived subject matter caused changes to be made to the originally released version by TV and radio programmers, who also shortened the track. The track has also been remixed by Skinny Puppy.

Keenan said the use of the words "stink" and "fist" and the resulting perception of "fist fucking" is actually symbolic in dealing with a friend of drummer Danny Carey who "isn't afraid of getting his hands dirty" rather than a "write-off" of the sexual term. Instead, fist fucking is a metaphor for the real cause of ailment. Keenan would introduce the song during the Ænima tour as "about choosing compassion over fear".

Music video
The music video for "Stinkfist" was created with stop-motion animation techniques, and was directed by the band's guitarist Adam Jones (who had previous experience in art direction and animation). The video begins with a shot of an empty jar, electrical currents and a television screen covered in dust with the album cover "Smoke Box" appearing on it. It focuses on two members, one male and one female, of a race of sand people. They suck on tubes and swallow nails and wires that apparently hurt them and are ejected from their bodies, after which they are put into the jars and treasured. Another race of mutants has entrails that are plugged into a wall. At one point in the video one of the main characters is seen shaving and peeling off the sand skin revealing another layer of skin covered with tattoo-like designs covering the entire body. Towards the end of the video, the main male character is seen from the back which reveals a tumor-like life form growing from his left shoulder. At least one reviewer compared the visuals to the works of H. R. Giger.

The video achieved heavy rotation on MTV, although it was shown only with the title "Track #1" instead of "Stinkfist". MTV reasoned that "Stinkfist" was too offensive for public consumption. Matt Pinfield, the host of 120 Minutes, responded on air to the lot of email complaints received from fans by saying there was nothing he could do about it. While he said "if you don't know the name of the song, go out and buy the album," he was waving his fist in front of his face. When introducing the video, video jockey Kennedy would also sniff her clenched fist dramatically before saying "Track #1". The video was ranked at number six in a feature on Scuzz of viewer's top 50 music videos of all time, and number one in its list of the "Top 10 Most F*cked Up Videos".

Track listing

UK single

10" single

Chart performance

References

External links
 The unofficial Tool FAQ
 Stinkfist interpretations

1996 singles
1996 songs
Tool (band) songs
Songs written by Maynard James Keenan
Songs written by Danny Carey
Songs written by Paul D'Amour
Songs written by Adam Jones (musician)
Song recordings produced by David Bottrill
Volcano Entertainment singles
Stop-motion animated music videos